Sása may refer to:

 Sása, Revúca District, Slovakia
 Sása, Zvolen District, Slovakia

See also 
 Szász